Varronia globosa is a flowering plant. An evergreen shrub it is a short-lived perennial. It is listed an endangered in Florida. It has white flowers and red berries.

In 1807, Philip Miller described it as globular-spiked varronia.

In 1974, a specimen held at the Smithsonian was collected from Northeast Brazil.

References
 

Boraginaceae